Aristóbulo del Valle (15 March 1845 – 29 January 1896) was a lawyer and politician born in Dolores, . He was, together with Leandro Alem, one of the founders of the Radical Civic Union.

Del Valle studied in the Faculty of Law of the University of Buenos Aires. He abandoned his studies to join the army during the Paraguayan War, took them up later and graduated. As a young man, he worked in the El Nacional newspaper of the city of Buenos Aires.

He entered politics supporting Adolfo Alsina, and was elected diputado (member of the Argentine Chamber of Deputies) in 1870. In 1876 he was elected to the Argentine Senate, and presided over the Upper House in 1880–1881.

He took part in the activism against the government of Miguel Juárez Celman in 1890 and was even considered an instigator of the uprisings of the 1890 revolution, due to which he was forced to leave his senatorial office, but he was re-elected the next year. From that point on, he supported the formation of the Radical Civic Union, an offshoot of the Civic Union proposed by Leandro Alem.

Del Valle also served in several Ministries during the term of President Luis Sáenz Peña (1892–1895). After his retirement, he taught law in the University of Buenos Aires. He died in his office at the School of Law in 1896, and is buried in La Recoleta Cemetery.

Sources
 This article draws from the corresponding article in the Spanish Wikipedia.

See also

1845 births
Valle, Aristobulo dell
People from Buenos Aires Province
Members of the Argentine Chamber of Deputies elected in Buenos Aires Province
Members of the Argentine Senate for Buenos Aires
Government ministers of Argentina
Radical Civic Union politicians
Burials at La Recoleta Cemetery